Deborah Watson (born 30 May 1964) is a British sprint canoer who competed in the mid-1980s. She finished seventh in the K-4 500 m event at the 1984 Summer Olympics in Los Angeles.

References
Sports-Reference.com profile

1964 births
Canoeists at the 1984 Summer Olympics
Living people
Olympic canoeists of Great Britain
British female canoeists